Man Wanted is a 1995 Hong Kong action thriller film directed by Benny Chan and Steve Cheng and starring Simon Yam, Yu Rongguang, Christy Chung and Eileen Tung.

Plot
Lok Man-wah (Simon Yam), an undercover cop, sets up a sting for a notorious drug lord and Man-wah's friend Luk Chan-fung (Yu Rongguang). Luk manages to escape but falls victim to a car bomb planted in his getaway vehicle. Following the funeral, Man-wah begins to put the moves on Luk's ex-girlfriend Yung (Christy Chung), even though he is already involved with June (Eileen Tung), another woman. Later it is revealed that Luk is not dead and insists on Man-wah help him in a kidnapping scheme, thus beginning an elaborate revenge scheme that costs June her life and Lok his career.

Cast
Simon Yam as Lok Man-wah
Yu Rongguang as Luk Chan-fung
Christy Chung as Yung-yung
Eileen Tung as June Lok
Law Kar-ying as Blad Ying
Cherie Chan as Mindy
Kenneth Chan as Officer Tai
Parkman Wong as Inspector Wong
Bill Lung as Brother Wu
Kwan Chung
John Wakefield as Police Review Board officer
Wong Man-shing
Ng Kam-hung
Emana Leung
Chung Yuk-ting
Chang Kwok-hei
Lee Ka-hung
So Wai-nam
Simon Cheung as Policeman
Chang Kin-yung as Policeman
Wong Wai-shun as Robber
Lam Kwok-kit

References

External links

1995 films
Hong Kong action thriller films
1995 action thriller films
Police detective films
1990s Cantonese-language films
Golden Harvest films
Films directed by Benny Chan
Films set in Hong Kong
Films shot in Hong Kong
1990s Hong Kong films